The 2014 Brent London Borough Council  election took place on 22 May 2014 to elect members of Brent London Borough Council in London, England. The whole council was up for election and the Labour Party stayed in overall control of the council.

Background
At the last election in 2010 Labour gained control of the council with 40 councillors, compared to 17 for the Liberal Democrats and 6 for the Conservatives. In July 2012 the Labour majority was increased when a Liberal Democrat councillor for Alperton, James Allie, defected to the Labour party. The Liberal Democrats lost another councillor in June 2013 when Brondesbury Park councillor Carol Shaw switched back to the Conservatives, ten years after she had defected from the Conservatives to the Liberal Democrats. However the Liberal Democrats did gain from a defection, when in December 2013 a Welsh Harp councillor Dhiraj Kataria left Labour to join the Liberal Democrats.

A seat was vacant before the 2010 election in Dudden Hill, after Liberal Democrat councillor David Clues resigned from the council less than 6 months before the election, after having moved to Brighton. A total of 222 candidates stood for election in 2010, contesting the 63 seats on the council across 21 wards. The candidates included full slates from the Labour, Liberal Democrat and Conservative parties, as well as Green Party candidates across the council and a number of UK Independence Party, Trade Unionist and Socialist Coalition and independent candidates.

Election result
Labour increased their majority on the council making 16 gains and reducing the Liberal Democrats to just 1 seat on the council. Labour gained seats in Alperton, Dollis Hill, Dudden Hill, Mapesbury, Queens Park, Sudbury, Welsh Harp and Willesden Green from the Liberal Democrats, as well as seats in Northwick Park and Preston from the Conservatives. The 15 seats lost by the Liberal Democrats included the group leader Paul Lorber in Sudbury and meant Helen Carr in Mapesbury was the only Liberal Democrat remaining on the council.

The Conservatives stayed steady on 6 councillors after losing seats to Labour, but gaining 2 seats from the Liberal Democrats in Brondesbury Park. They finished second in vote share with 21%, but well behind Labour who got 47% of the vote. Overall turnout at the election was 36%.

Following the election Labour councillor Muhammed Butt remained leader of the council, defeating a challenge within his party from Neil Nerva. Meanwhile, the Conservative group split in half, with the 3 councillors from Brondesbury Park ward forming their own Brondesbury Park Conservatives group, after failing to replace Kenton councillor Suresh Kansahra as leader of the Conservative group, while the 3 Kenton Conservative councillors remained in the Conservative group.

|}

Ward results

References

2014
Brent